Rügen chalk (German: Rügener Kreide or Rügener Schreibkreide) is the common name for a very pure, very fine-grained, white, crumbly and highly porous chalk that forms the highest member of the German Upper Cretaceous, and is of Maastrichtian age. It is found exposed in cliffs on the coast of the Jasmund peninsula in the northeast of the island of Rügen in Mecklenburg-Vorpommern.

In addition, Rügener Kreide is the trade name for the white pigment that is extracted from these limestones.

Stratigraphy 
Lithostratigraphically, the Rügen chalk belongs to the Hemmoor Formation of the Chalk Group and is formally defined as the Rügen Member within this formation. Chronostratigraphically, the Rügen Member falls into the late lower to late upper Lower Maastrichtian (approx. 70 million years ago). Chalk widely occurs in the subsurface of Northern Germany, but is largely overlain by several hundred metre thick Cenozoic deposits.

Features 
 Chalk limestones are often layered. The Rügen chalk, however, is unlayered and massive. The rock is extremely fine grained and very low cementation, which is associated with a high porosity. The low cementation and high porosity mean that the rock can soak up a lot of water. While dry Rügen chalk is relatively crumbly but still  brittle, water-saturated Rügen chalk is more plastic, almost like moist clay, and can be cut with a knife. Like many other limestones of the Upper Cretaceous, the Rügen chalk has a very high content of calcium carbonate (CaCO3, "carbonate of lime"). With the Rügen chalk the calcium carbonate content is at least 97%. The vast majority of calcium carbonate is in the form of micrometer-sized low-Mg calcite platelets, so-called coccoliths, which are remnants of unicellular, planktonic calcareous algae, so-called coccolithophores. The calcareous algae lived around 70 million years ago in the light-flooded surface water of a sea that covered northern Germany. After their death, they sank to the bottom of the sea and, over time, formed huge deposits of limestone mud. This lime sludge has come down to us today in the form of the Rügen chalk.

Another characteristic feature of the Rügen chalk is its high content of flint concretions. These are usually formed as nodules and enriched in individual horizons. Sometimes there are also flat formations of different thicknesses. Particularly large, cylindrical flint concretions are known as "Sassnitz flower pots" (see also → Paramoudra). The silicon dioxide (SiO2), from which the flint stones were formed, originally came from single-celled plankton (radiolarians, diatoms), which lived together with the calcareous algae in the Chalk seas. After the deposition of the coccolith sludge containing radiolaria and diatoms, the SiO2 of the diatoms dissolved in the water that circulated in the pore space of the sediment and was again  precipitated elsewhere in the sediment. These deposits are seen today as the flint stones. Since the flint is clearly more weathering- and  erosion-resistant than the limestone, it collects on the beach of the chalk cliff and is transported to neighboring areas of the coast by waves and currents during storms and deposited there. The Feuersteinfelder at Prora are particularly well-known in this regard.

Occurrence 
There are extensive chalk deposits in the northeastern part of the island of Rügen, on the peninsula of Jasmund. The best known are probably the "Rügener chalk cliffs" of the cliffed coast in the vicinity of Sassnitz (see also → Stubbenkammer, →  Königsstuhl). These coastal formations are part of the Jasmund National Park and are under strict nature protection.

In the hinterland of the Jasmund, chalk is also found under a 1 to 10 m thickoverburden in the subsoil. There are many quarries and open pit mines, almost all of which have since been abandoned due to inefficiency or for reasons of landscape protection. Overflowing with water, they can be seen in aerial photos of Jasmund as small and large lakes and ponds (the currently largest is the “Kreidesee Wittenfelde”). Even in the urban area of Sassnitz one can still see old chalk quarries, but they date from the beginning of the 19th century. Chalk is currently being mined in the  Promoisel open pit mine.

History

General 

By 1720, chalk was used in the Granitz for the production of quicklime (CaO) in  quarries. However, the foundation for the Rügen chalk industry was not laid until the first half of the 19th century. It was laid by the entrepreneur and naturalist Friedrich von Hagenow (1797-1865). In 1832 he leased the chalk quarries in the Stubnitz, and in the same year he opened a chalk factory in Greifswald. At that time, the raw chalk came by ship from Jasmund to Hagenow's factory. By slurrying, the raw chalk was separated from the undesirable rock components such as flint (firestones, see above) and finer-grained impurities (so-called Grand), and the same principle is still used today. In the days of Hagenows and also long after, however, the excavation and preparation of the chalk were carried out almost exclusively with human muscle power and the work was physically very strenuous.

During the late 19th century, the fishing village of Sassnitz, located in the immediate vicinity of the Stubnitz, slowly developed into a centre of the chalk industry, not least because most of the chalk pits were on the Jasmund. A fierce competition developed between the individual chalk plants. Von Hagenow had to give up his business in 1850. As a result, 17 companies with 23 chalk plants merged in 1899 to form a cartel and set up limits on all member's production volumes and prices. In 1928, around 500,000 tonnes of rough chalk from the Jasmunder fractures were mined in Martinshafen at Großer Jasmunder Bodden and loaded in Sassnitz. With 80,000 tonnes of capacity, however, the mud chalk production on the Jasmund played only a minor role at that time. The buyers of the raw chalk were mainly the Portland cement plants in Wolgast,  Lebbin and Stettin. So some pits and chalk plants on the Jasmund belonged directly to the Stettiner Portlandzementfabrik A. G. of Martin Quistorp. The other major chalk and cement producer and most important player in the Rügen Chalk Cartel was the Pommersche Industrieverein a. A. founded in 1872 by Johannes Quistorp.

With the collapse at the end of the Second World War, chalk extraction and processing came to a temporary standstill. Some facilities, including the chalk cable car to Sassnitz harbor, were dismantled and brought to the Soviet Union as war reparations. In addition, the fact that the island of Rügen belonged to the Soviet occupation zone and later to the GDR meant the elimination of private economic structures in the Rügen chalk industry for the next 45 years. It was only in this period that modern technology completely replaced strenuous physical work in many areas. Since chalk was soon in demand again as a raw material with the reconstruction, a total of 19 chalk quarries started operations on Rügen after 1945, which were combined in the  VEB Vereinigte Kreidewerke Rügen  after 1957. By 1945, the dismantling has been stopped in the oldest quarries on the eastern edge of the Jasmund and at Lohme, as well as in the quarries from Dumsevitz,  Rosengarten and Altkamp Südrügen. With the completion of a large and modern chalk works in Klementelvitz between Sassnitz and Sagard, many other smaller chalk quarries were closed after 1962 and the company was renamed "VEB Kreidewerk Rügen". During the GDR era, the company belonged to various institutions. In 1984 the legal independence of the VEB Kreidewerk Rügen was finally abolished and it was assigned to the "VEB Zementwerke  Rüdersdorf" as "Operating Part 6". Under favorable conditions, the Klementelvitz chalk works, which after commissioning was considered to be one of the most modern chalk works in Europe, achieved an annual production of 185,000 t chalk and 55,000 t Grand.

In the course of the economic upheavals following the Peaceful Revolution in 1989 and 1990, VEB Zementwerke Rüdersdorf was taken over by  Readymix AG and the chalk factory in Klementelvitz was spun off, converted into a  GmbH and initially remained with the Treuhandanstalt. The operation of the mine railways for the transport of raw chalk from the Wittenfelde open pit mine north of Klementelvitz, the only active chalk pit on Rügen at that time, was discontinued. On August 13, 1993, after clarification of all land ownership issues, the  Kreidewerk Rügen GmbH  was taken over by the  Vereinigte Kreidewerke Dammann KG  and thus the Swiss  Omya AG. <ref name = "Festschrift"> Botho-Ekkehard Hendel:  The company Kreidewerk Rügen GmbH.  In: 20 Years Mining Authority Stralsund.' 'Ministry of Economy, Labor and Tourism Mecklenburg-Western Pomerania, 2010, p. 19–21.</ref> By then, the company's sales had fallen to only 25,000 t. Omya invested in total by 2010 almost € 50 million  and built a state-of-the-art facility for chalk production - from excavation to loading. At the end of the 1990s, the Wittenfelde open pit mine was shut down  and in its place the Promoisel open pit mine about 1 km further west was put into operation. At the start of mining, around 25 million t of raw chalk was available there. The freshly broken chalk now reaches the factory via a 2 km long conveyor system, where it is processed into refined chalk in different grain sizes using the new wet processing technology. The annual production of the plant is now up to 500,000 t.  In 2009 the planning approval was issued for the future Goldberg / Lancken-Dubnitz mining field south of Klementelvitz for production through 2117 of 35 million t of chalk. 

 Extraction 

In the 19th and early 20th century, the chalk had to be dislodged from a steep mine face with pickaxes and transported on lorries to the so-called agitators. In large vats, in which iron hooks rotated, the chalk was stirred with the addition of water. In this step, the coarsest components, mostly flint, were separated. The chalk and water mixture, also called Kreidemilch or Kreidetrübe, was passed through separation tanks where the finer impurities, the Grand, settled out. The chalk suspension freed from the grand finally ended up in the settling basin, in which the still- suspended particles settled out and accumulated into a layer about 30 cm thick. The now no longer cloudy water was drained and the basin was filled with fresh chalk suspension, so that the fine particles could settle again. The whole process was repeated until the sediment reached a thickness of approximately 1.5 meters. The finished fine chalk still had a water content of 30 to 35%. This heavy, mass was then knocked out, that is, it was shoveled out of the settling basins into carts. The workers who carried out the work steps from dismantling to knocking out were called sludgers.

Other workers, the so-called formers, transported the wet chalk with the carts to the dry sheds, and formed the chalk into shovel-sized masses and laid them out there for drying. The chalk had to be relayered several times during the dry season of about four weeks. With a residual moisture of approximately 5%, the chalk was ready for shipping at that time.

From the turn of the 19th to the 20th century, the mining and processing of the chalk became increasingly industrialized, which significantly increased the production volume of raw chalk and the prepared chalk (known in German as Schlämmkreide.) Even before 1945, about a dozen excavators were in operation during chalk mining. From the Jasmund quarries, the rough chalk came either via a railway line, the Kreidebahn, to Martinshafen near Sagard (there are also old quarries) or with a cable car to the Port of Sassnitz. The chalk railway forked towards the mining area into a northern and a southern section of the line. The southern line ran from Wittenfelde via Klementelvitz and Quatzendorf to Marlow, where it merged with the northern line from Gummanz. The Rügen Kleinbahn also played an important role in transport to the ports. In 1914, in order to relieve the ports of Sassnitz and Martinshafen,  Wiek on the Wittow completed the so-called Kreidebrücke'' for loading the chalk on barges, which was reopened 100 years later as a "floating promenade".

Production continued after 1945 with pre-war technology. In order to increase the flow rate and at the same time to guarantee a consistent quality of the chalk with a residual moisture of about 0.5% and grain sizes not above 63 microns, new technologies were developed and a new chalk plant constructed in Klementelvitz<ref>Kreidewerk Klementelvitz.'] Data sheet with photo (from 1999) on Kleks-Online.</ref> after 1958 for 30 million  Mark (DDR). In this context, the heavy physical work in the mine face was completely replaced by modern conveyors such as the excavator UB 80, a GDR standard excavator of the 1960s and 1970s. Both the raw chalk and the debris were transported by railways. With the completion of this plant in 1962 (initially trial operation, from 1963 regular production) the production time from excavation to shipping was reduced to only 80 minutes. Until then, it was up to 80 days.

The chalk lorries and the excavators later became larger (UB 162-1), and on an experimental basis, 20-m3 lorries designed for lignite open pit mining were also used in the mines, after the tracks had been converted accordingly. Depending on the ground conditions, heavy trucks also took over the removal of debris, and special excavators were used for the installation of preassembled tracks. The chalk was also partially preprocessed in open-cast mining using a "mobile sludge device".

 Uses 
Like any other nearly pure limestone, the Rügen chalk can be used for both cement production and the production of agricultural lime. A relatively modern field of application of limestone is flue-gas desulfurization, and Rügen chalk of inferior quality is put to this use, especially in the coal power plants, Rostock Power Station and Jänschwalde Power Station. Sulfur oxides (SOX) react with the calcium carbonate to produce gypsum (CaSO4) and carbon dioxide (CO2). While the carbon dioxide escapes into the atmosphere, the gypsum is reused in the construction industry. 

Even before 1945, chalk was shipped by train to Berlin, Bremen, Hamburg, to Ruhrgebiet, to Breslau and Stettin, where it was used in the electrical, paint and cosmetics industries. From the 1960s onwards, in contrast to pre-war production, the VEB Kreidewerk Rügen was supplied with chalk in three grain types as desired – "Malkreide 60", "Feinkreide 40" and "Mikrotherm 20". Under the name "Three Crown Chalk" (trade name of the Swedish Pomeranian era), this was a major export item of the GDR, which was delivered to 40 countries. Customers continued to include the rubber and cable industry and plants in the paint and paint industry, as well as the cosmetics and pharmaceutical industries. Since 1974, powdered chalk has been processed as a white pigment for the paint "GW 12" in the Quatzendorf sub-plant.Kreidewerk Quatzendorf. Data sheet with photos on Kleks-Online. About 8,000 of these are retailed each year.

Contrary to what the name "writing chalk" (see above), still used in lithostratigraphy today, suggests, the Rügen chalk is not and was not used for the production of school and wall panel chalk. At least in Central Europe, it is made exclusively of gypsum.

With the advent of the wellness and alternative medicine movements, Rügen chalk is increasingly being offered as a so-called healing chalk for mud packs and other applications.

 Bibliography 
 Heinz Lehmann, Renate Meyer: Rügen A–Z (Arkona – Zudar). Wähmann-Verlag, Schwerin 1976, S. 46
 Mike Reich, Peter Frenzel: Die Fauna und Flora der Rügener Schreibkreide (Maastrichtium, Ostsee).'' Archiv für Geschiebekunde. Bd. 3, Nr. 2, 2002 ([http://www.researchgate.net/publication/233386528_Die_Fauna_und_Flora_der_Rgener_Schreibkreide_%28Maastrichtium_Ostsee%29__The_fauna_and_flora_of_the_Rgen_White_Chalk_%28Maastrichtian_Baltic_Sea%29 ResearchGate).

Weblinks 

 Zur Geschichte der Rügener Kreide. at the website of the United Chalk Works Dammann KG
 Christine Damerow, Karlheinz Markmann: Exkursionsführer Kreidebruch Gummanz. Kreidelehrpfad/Kreidemuseum Gummanz, Projekt des Vereins der Freunde und Förderer des Nationalparkes Jasmund e. V.
 Webpräsenz des Kreidemuseums Gummanz

References 

Limestone
Inorganic pigments
Rügen
Mecklenburg-Vorpommern